"Lemons (Lemonade)" is a single by South African rappers AKA and Nasty C, released on 16 September 2022 as album's lead single from his fourth studio album MASS COUNTRY. Music video premiered also premiered on YouTube same day.

Commercial performance 
"Lemons (Lemonade)" was certified Platinum by the Recording Industry of South Africa (RiSA).

Composition and lyrics 
In the first verse of the release, AKA let's the world know that he's past the mourning stage of his late fiancée Anele Tembe, and at the same time he wants to thank God that people showed their true colors when he was going through tough times.

Certification and sales

References

External links 
 

2022 singles
2022 songs
AKA (rapper)
AKA (rapper) songs
Nasty C songs